Caridina profundicola is species of fresh water shrimp endemic to Lake Towuti on the Indonesian island of Sulawesi.

Habitat and ecology 
C. profundicola is found in deep (roughly three meters or deeper) parts of lake Towuti, where it lives between submerged bolders and is often found with Caridina spinata.

Threats 
Like many of the shrimp from the lakes of Sulawesi, C. profundicola faces a number of threats, including non-native predators, pollution, and the damning of waterways for hydroelectric power.

References 

Crustaceans described in 2009
Atyidae
Freshwater crustaceans of Asia
Crustaceans of Indonesia
Endemic fauna of Indonesia
Endemic freshwater shrimp of Sulawesi